The Hundred of McCallum is a cadastral hundred of the County of Buckingham, centered on the rural locality of McCallum and the Ngarkat area in South Australia. It was proclaimed by Governor Malcolm Barclay-Harvey in 1939 and named for Thomas McCallum, member of the South Australian parliament upper house and pastoral pioneer in the Ngarkat area.

References

McCallum